Manfred Ommer (13 September 1950 – 21 May 2021) was a German sprinter. He competed in the men's 200 metres at the 1972 Summer Olympics representing West Germany.

Life
At the 1971 European Athletics Championships, he was eliminated with the 4 × 100 metres relay in the final (loss of baton). In 1972 he became German champion over 100 and 200 meters. At the 1972 Summer Olympics in Munich he retired in the 200 metres run in the semifinals. Ommer - a member of the relay - was the only German athlete who did not compete after the Munich massacre at the 1972 Summer Olympics in Munich. In 1974 he was German champion over 100 and 200 meters again. His greatest success is the silver medal with 20.76s in the 200 metres run at the 1974 European Athletics Championships. In the 100 metres run he was in 10.36s sixth, the relay was disqualified. In 1977 he confessed to doping with Dianabol. In the newly emerging doping discussion in 2013 after submission of the final report of the anti-doping commission, he accused the Freiburg physician Armin Klümper: Klümper was the largest doper on this planet.

Manfred Ommer belonged to the sports club Bayer 04 Leverkusen. In his active time he was 1.77 m tall and weighed 71 kg.

From 1986 until March 8, 1994, Ommer was president of the German soccer club FC 08 Homburg in Homburg, Saarland.

References

External links
 
 

1950 births
2021 deaths
Athletes (track and field) at the 1972 Summer Olympics
German male sprinters
German national athletics champions
Olympic athletes of West Germany
People from Bergisch Gladbach
Sportspeople from Cologne (region)
Doping cases in athletics
German football chairmen and investors